The 2019 WNBA season was the 20th season for the Indiana Fever of the Women's National Basketball Association. The Fever opened the season on May 24, 2019 against the New York Liberty.

The Fever had a promising start to their season, winning three of their first four games.  However, from there they lost eight of their next ten to finish June with a 5–9 record.  July proved disastrous for any playoff hopes the team had.  Six losses in the month were book-ended by two wins.  One bright spot from July was that Erica Wheeler was named WNBA All-Star Game MVP.  The Fever's form improved into August where they posted a 4–5 record.  Winning their last two games proved too little too late, as they missed out on a playoff spot for the third straight year.

After the season, it was announced that General Manager and Head Coach Pokey Chatman would not return for the 2020 season.

Transactions

WNBA Draft

The Fever made three selections in the 2019 WNBA Draft, which was held on April 10:

Trades and roster changes

Roster

Schedule

Preseason

|- style="background:#bbffbb"
| 1
| May 14
| @ Chicago Sky
| W 69–58
| K. Mitchell (11)
| McCowan (8)
| K. Mitchell (4)
| Wintrust Arena4,033
| 1–0
|- style="background:#bbffbb"
| 2
| May 16
| Chicago Sky
| W 76–65
| T. Mitchell (15)
| Tied (7)
| Wheeler (8)
| Bankers Life Fieldhouse3,794
| 2–0
|- style="background:#bbffbb"
| 3
| May 19
| @ Dallas Wings
| W 71–66
| K. Mitchell (26)
| McCowan (6)
| Johnson (6)
| College Park Center3,428
| 3–0

Regular season

|- style="background:#bbffbb"
| 1
| May 24
| @ New York Liberty
| W 81–80
| T. Mitchell (22)
| Dupree (7)
| Wheeler (5)
| Westchester County Center1,965
| 1–0
|- style="background:#fcc"
| 2
| May 28
| @ Connecticut Sun
| L 77–88
| Wheeler (26)
| Dupree (8)
| Wheeler (9)
| Mohegan Sun Arena4,781
| 1–1

|- style="background:#bbffbb"
| 3
| June 1
| New York Liberty
| W 92–77 
| K. Mitchell (23)
| McCowan (6)
| Wheeler (6)
| Bankers Life Fieldhouse5,003
| 2–1
|- style="background:#bbffbb"
| 4
| June 7
| Dallas Wings
| W 79–64 
| Achonwa (17)
| Tied (11)
| Wheeler (9)
| Bankers Life Fieldhouse3,671
| 3–1
|- style="background:#fcc"
| 5
| June 9
| Phoenix Mercury
| L 87–94 
| K. Mitchell (26)
| Achonwa (7)
| K. Mitchell (6)
| Bankers Life Fieldhouse3,336
| 3–2
|- style="background:#fcc"
| 6
| June 11
| Seattle Storm
| L 82–84 
| K. Mitchell (21)
| Dupree (15)
| K. Mitchell (7)
| Bankers Life Fieldhouse3,506
| 3–3
|- style="background:#bbffbb"
| 7
| June 13
| @ Dallas Wings
| W 76–72 
| Dupree (20)
| Laney (11) 
| T. Mitchell (5)
| College Park Center3,562
| 4–3
|- style="background:#fcc"
| 8
| June 15
| Chicago Sky
| L 64–70 
| K. Mitchell (16)
| T. Mitchell (8)
| Wheeler (8)
| Bankers Life Fieldhouse4,715
| 4–4
|- style="background:#fcc"
| 9
| June 19
| @ Atlanta Dream
| L 78–88 
| Dupree (19)
| McCowan (14)
| Wheeler (5)
| State Farm Arena6,474
| 4–5
|- style="background:#bbffbb"
| 10
| June 21
| @ Chicago Sky
| W 76–69 
| Wheeler (28)
| McCowan (13)
| Wheeler (8)
| Wintrust Arena4,945
| 5–5
|- style="background:#fcc"
| 11
| June 23
| @ Seattle Storm
| L 61–65 
| Wheeler (18)
| McCowan (13)
| Wheeler (4)
| Alaska Airlines Arena7,211
| 5–6
|- style="background:#fcc"
| 12
| June 25
| Minnesota Lynx
| L 74–78 
| K. Mitchell (17)
| 3 tied (7)
| Wheeler (4)
| Bankers Life Fieldhouse4,692
| 5–7
|- style="background:#fcc"
| 13
| June 28
| @ Phoenix Mercury
| L 69–91 
| Dupree (15)
| McCowan (10)
| Wheeler (3)
| Talking Stick Resort Arena9,435
| 5–8
|- style="background:#fcc"
| 14
| June 29
| @ Las Vegas Aces
| L 97–102 (OT) 
| K. Mitchell (21)
| Achonwa (9)
| Wheeler (8)
| Mandalay Bay Events Center4,581
| 5–9

|- style="background:#bbffbb"
| 15
| July 5
| @ Dallas Wings
| W 76–58
| T. Mitchell (16)
| McCowan (12)
| Wheeler (7)
| College Park Center5,093
| 6–9
|- style="background:#fcc"
| 16
| July 10
| Las Vegas Aces
| L 71–74
| Dupree (13)
| McCowan (12)
| Wheeler (7)
| Bankers Life Fieldhouse9,247
| 6–10
|- style="background:#fcc"
| 17
| July 12
| Los Angeles Sparks
| L 84–90
| Tied (11)
| 3 tied (5)
| K. Mitchell (5)
| Bankers Life Fieldhouse7,849
| 6–11
|- style="background:#fcc"
| 18
| July 14
| Connecticut Sun
| L 63–76
| K. Mitchell (14)
| McCowan (8)
| Tied (4)
| Bankers Life Fieldhouse6,434
| 6–12
|- style="background:#fcc"
| 19
| July 19
| Washington Mystics
| L 88–95 (OT)
| Wheeler (18)
| Achonwa (12)
| Wheeler (5)
| Bankers Life Fieldhouse6,726
| 6–13
|- style="background:#fcc"
| 20
| July 21
| @ Chicago Sky
| L 70–78
| Wheeler (13)
| McCowan (16)
| Wheeler (9)
| Wintrust Arena6,614
| 6–14
|- style="background:#fcc"
| 21
| July 23
| @ Phoenix Mercury
| L 77–95
| Wheeler (18)
| McCowan (9)
| Wheeler (9)
| Talking Stick Resort Arena8,528
| 6–15
|- style="background:#bbffbb"
| 22
| July 31
| Atlanta Dream
| W 61–59
| Wheeler (15)
| McCowan (14)
| K. Mitchell (4)
| Bankers Life Fieldhouse5,702
| 7–15

|- style="background:#bbffbb"
| 23
| August 3
| Minnesota Lynx
| W 86–75
| K. Mitchell (20)
| McCowan (8)
| K. Mitchell (9)
| Bankers Life Fieldhouse7,884
| 8–15
|- style="background:#fcc"
| 24
| August 8
| @ Washington Mystics
| L 78–91
| K. Mitchell (18)
| Mavunga (6)
| K. Mitchell (6)
| St. Elizabeth's East Arena3,013
| 8–16
|- style="background:#bbffbb"
| 25
| August 10
| Atlanta Dream
| W 87–82
| Wheeler (19)
| Dupree (9)
| Wheeler (7)
| Bankers Life Fieldhouse7,923
| 9–16
|- style="background:#fcc"
| 26
| August 18
| @ Washington Mystics
| L 68–107
| T. Mitchell (17)
| McCowan (10)
| Achonwa (5)
| St. Elizabeth's East Arena4,034
| 9–17
|- style="background:#fcc"
| 27
| August 20
| New York Liberty
| L 76–82
| McCowan (24)
| McCowan (8)
| Tied (5)
| Bankers Life Fieldhouse5,340
| 9–18
|- style="background:#fcc"
| 28
| August 22
| @ Los Angeles Sparks
| L 65–98
| K. Mitchell (14)
| McCowan (7)
| Wheeler (6)
| Staples Center8,816
| 9–19
|- style="background:#bbffbb"
| 29
| August 25
| @ Seattle Storm
| W 63–54
| McCowan (22)
| McCowan (19)
| Tied (3)
| Alaska Airlines Arena8,076
| 10–19
|- style="background:#bbffbb"
| 30
| August 27
| Las Vegas Aces
| W 86–71
| McCowan (24)
| McCowan (17)
| 4 tied (4)
| Bankers Life Fieldhouse6,958
| 11–19
|- style="background:#fcc"
| 31
| August 29
| Los Angeles Sparks
| L 83–87
| McCowan (24)
| McCowan (10)
| K. Mitchell (5)
| Bankers Life Fieldhouse5,641
| 11–20

|- style="background:#fcc"
| 32
| September 1
| @ Minnesota Lynx
| L 73–81
| Dupree (18)
| McCowan (11)
| T. Mitchell (6)
| Target Center8,833
| 11–21
|- style="background:#bbffbb"
| 33
| September 6
| @ New York Liberty
| W 86–81
| K. Mitchell (22)
| McCowan (13)
| Wheeler (6)
| Westchester County Center2,301
| 12–21
|- style="background:#bbffbb"
| 34
| September 8
| Connecticut Sun
| W 104–76
| K. Mitchell (38)
| McCowan (9)
| Laney (7)
| Bankers Life Fieldhouse5,451
| 13–21

Standings

Awards and honors

Statistics

Regular season

Source:

References

External links
The Official Site of the Indiana Fever

2018
2019 WNBA season
2019 in sports in Indiana